Ragnar Sven Ericzon (5 June 1926 – 5 March 2010) was a Swedish javelin thrower who won a bronze medal at the 1950 European Athletics Championships. He competed at the 1952 Summer Olympics and finished in seventh place.

References

1926 births
2010 deaths
Swedish male javelin throwers
Olympic athletes of Sweden
Athletes (track and field) at the 1952 Summer Olympics
European Athletics Championships medalists
People from Hedemora Municipality
Sportspeople from Dalarna County